Keith A. Gessen (born January 9, 1975) is a Russian-born American novelist, journalist, and literary translator. He is co-founder and co-editor of American literary magazine n+1 and an assistant professor of journalism at the Columbia University Graduate School of Journalism. In 2008 he was named a "5 under 35" honoree by the National Book Foundation.

Early life and education

Born Konstantin Alexandrovich Gessen into a Jewish family in Moscow, Russian SFSR, Soviet Union, he and his parents and sibling moved to the United States in 1981. They settled in the Boston area, living in Brighton, Brookline and Newton, Massachusetts.

Gessen's mother was a literary critic and his father is a computer scientist now specializing in forensics. His siblings are Masha Gessen, Daniel Gessen and Philip Gessen. His maternal grandmother, Ruzya Solodovnik, was a Soviet government censor of dispatches filed by foreign reporters such as Harrison Salisbury; his paternal grandmother, Ester Goldberg Gessen, was a translator for a foreign literary magazine.

Gessen graduated from Harvard University with a B.A. in history and literature in 1998. He completed the course-work for his M.F.A. in creative writing from Syracuse University in 2004 but did not initially receive a degree, having failed to submit "a final original work of fiction." According to his Columbia University faculty biography, he ultimately received the degree.

Career

Gessen has written about Russia for The New Yorker, The London Review of Books, The Atlantic, and the New York Review of Books. In 2004–2005, he was the regular book critic for New York magazine. In 2005, Dalkey Archive Press published Gessen's translation of Svetlana Alexievich's Voices from Chernobyl, an oral history of the Chernobyl nuclear disaster. In 2009, Penguin published his translation (with Anna Summers) of Ludmilla Petrushevskaya's There Once Lived a Woman Who Tried to Kill Her Neighbor's Baby: Scary Fairy Tales.

Gessen's first novel, All the Sad Young Literary Men, was published in April 2008 and received mixed reviews. Joyce Carol Oates wrote that "in this debut novel there is much that is charming and beguiling, and much promise". The novelist Jonathan Franzen has said of Gessen, "It's so delicious the way he writes. I like it a lot." New York Magazine, on the other hand, called the novel "self-satisfied" and "boringly solipsistic".

In 2010, Gessen edited and introduced Diary of a Very Bad Year: Confessions of an Anonymous Hedge Fund Manager, a book about the financial crisis. In 2011, he became involved in the Occupy Movement in New York City. He co-edited the OCCUPY! Gazette, a newspaper reporting on Occupy Wall Street and sponsored by n+1. On November 17, 2011, Gessen was arrested by the New York City police while covering and participating in an Occupy protest at the New York Stock Exchange. 
He wrote about his experience for The New Yorker.

In 2015, Gessen co-edited City by City: Dispatches from the American Metropolis, which was named a "Best Summer Read of 2015" by Publishers Weekly.

In 2018, Gessen's second novel, A Terrible Country, was published. In March 2019, it was serialized on BBC Radio 4.

Gessen wrote a non-fiction memoir about raising his son Raffi, titled Raising Raffi: The First Five Years which was published in 2022.

Personal life 
Gessen is married to the writer Emily Gould and was previously married when he arrived in New York City at age 22. , he resided in Clinton Hill, Brooklyn.

Bibliography

Novels

Non-fiction

Translations

References

External links

New York Inquirer 2006 interview with Gessen about n+1
Young Manhattanite 2008 interview with Gessen
New York Times profile of Gessen, April 27, 2008
"Here’s Why the Cookie Crumbled" Dwight Garner, The New York Times, July 13, 2010

American magazine editors
Living people
Soviet emigrants to the United States
Harvard College alumni
Syracuse University College of Visual and Performing Arts alumni
1975 births
American people of Russian-Jewish descent
People from Brookline, Massachusetts
Writers from Newton, Massachusetts
Writers from Brooklyn
21st-century American novelists
American male novelists
Jewish American writers
21st-century American male writers
Novelists from New York (state)
Novelists from Massachusetts
The New Yorker people
21st-century American non-fiction writers
American male non-fiction writers
21st-century American Jews